Sunil Shroff is the managing trustee of a non-government and non-profit organisation called MOHAN Foundation and is well known for his work in the field of deceased donation transplantation in India. He has worked towards improving the deceased organ donation rate in India.

Background
He was born in Sahibganj, Bihar and did his schooling from Kendriya Vidyalaya Gill Nagar, Chennai. He did his under-graduate and post graduate medical education from Prince of Wales Medical College now called Patna Medical College and Hospital in 1982 and FRCS in 1986 from Royal College of Physicians and Surgeons of Glasgow. He joined as a lecturer first at the Institute of Urology and then at the Royal London Hospital in London from 1991 to 1995.  He decided to return to India in 1995 and became Professor and Head of Department of Urology and Renal Transplantation at the Sri Ramachandra Medical College and Research Institute (SRMC & RI). Currently he is Senior Consultant, Urology and Renal Transplantation at Madras Medical Mission Hospital in Chennai.

Career
Sunil Shroff is a urologist and transplant surgeon from India. He was one of the first to publish his experience with the application of the holmium laser in urology from the Institute of Urology, London UK in collaboration with his mentor Graham Watson. He is currently Senior Consultant, Urology and Renal Transplantation at Madras Medical Mission Hospital, Chennai.

He started the kidney transplantation programme at SRMC in 1995 and in 1996 implemented the deceased donation transplantation programme. SRMC & RI was one of the first few hospitals in India to have established such a programme.

SRMC & RI was a 1540 bedded hospital, running both undergraduate and post-graduate Medical, Dental, Nursing and Allied Health Science Courses. The Urology Department obtained ISO 9000 2002 certificate for the department in the year 2003 and was the only departments in the country that had obtained this certification at that time. During this tenure he started two courses in urology and transplantation and trained over 20 M. Ch post-graduates in urology and about 100 Allied Health science graduates in Urology. He performed the first kidney transplant on an HIV positive patient in India and transplant of kidneys from cobra-bitten brain death victims.

Social entrepreneur

As a founder trustee of MOHAN Foundation he has been actively promoting the concept of deceased donation after brain death since 1997. Through the foundation he has worked for policy improvements and amendment of the law to ease deceased donation in India. He has campaigned against organ commerce and believes that such activities which are reported widely by the media adversely affect public perception and acceptance of the deceased donation programme.

On the 9th of October 2020 Dr.Shroff was invited as a Karmveer by Sony Television to the popular national program - Kaun Banega Crorepati (KBC) anchored by Amitabh Bachchan, along with actor Riteish Deshmukh as the champion of the cause. The show was selected as a special event on the eve of Amitabh Bachchan birthday that falls on 11th Oct. Both Riteish and his wife Genelia had recently pledged to donate their organs. The show helped create awareness about organ donation and at the same time won MOHAN Foundation prize money to promote the cause.  On the request of Dr. Shroff, both Amitabh Bachchan and actor Riteish Deshmukh wore the Green ribbon and the KBC set was turned green in support of organ donation.

Since 2002 he has also promoted the use of computer and information technology among doctors in India to make healthcare delivery more efficient, easily accessible and affordable. To achieve these objectives he has been instrumental in conducting conferences under the banner of 'The Medical Computer Society of India' called MEDITEL. He is the chief editor of a health website called medindia.net that networks doctors and provides the public with health related information.

Currently he serves as the chief editor of the monthly e-newsletter on telehealth. He is the co-chair for ‘Telemedicine training for doctors’ for the TSI body and has been involved in training of almost 3,500 doctors in India. The experience with training of doctors in India has been  published by him and his training team.

He was the organizing secretary for TELEMEDICON 2020 - The 16th International Annual Conference of ‘Telemedicine Society of India’ from 18 December to 20 December 2020.  It was the first international-level tele-health conference after the notification of 'Telemedicine Practice Guidelines' by the Govt. of India and its theme was 'Telehealth - From the Fringes to the Mainstream'.

A report on the rise of tele-consultation during the Covid pandemic was released jointly by Telemedicine Society of India and PRACTO. He also hosted a panel discussion on challenges of tele-consultations with various stakeholders in the field in India during the conference.

Academic achievements
Shroff is president of INDIAN SOCIETY OF ORGAN TRANSPLANTATION, president of Tamil Nadu chapter of Telemedicine Society of India. He is immediate past president of The Nephrology, Urology and Transplantation Society of SAARC region for the years 2013 – 2015. He is also the convener of the Indian Transplantation Registry under the agesis of the Indian Society of Organ Transplantation. He is the National Editorial Advisory Board member of Indian Journal of Transplantation (IJT) and this is official journal of Indian Society of Organ Transplantation, a society with almost 1500 members.

He is Advisory Board Member for Tamil Nadu Cadaver Transplant committee in association with Department of Health, Govt. of Tamil  Nadu. The Board consist of 7 members with Principal Health Secretary of Tamil   Nadu as chairman. He is the editor of Indian Transplant Newsletter, a publication that is published quarterly and keeps track of deceased donation activities in India since 1998. He has over 40 publications in peer reviewed journals, has edited four books for paramedical staff and has written six chapters in medical books.

Other achievements
Shroff is the Asia coordinator for Tribute to Life Commonwealth project. He also was elected as Councilor from Asia for the International Society of Organ Donation and Procurement.

He has been invited to international kidney forums, delivered orations in medical conference and has received awards for his work related to deceased donation transplantation in India. He was a member at the Amsterdam forum in 2004 on the Care of the Live Kidney Donor. The forum participants from more than 40 countries representing all continents formulated guidelines on living kidney donor and the meeting was hosted by the Transplanatation. He delivered a speech in connection with Post-Centenary Platinum Jubilee Celebration of Madras Medical College in November 2009.

He was recognised by the Indian Society of Organ Transplantation in Hyderabad in 2010 for his contribution to the Indian transplant national registry. He was awarded the 2010 – Social Entrepreneur of the Year award from the TIE- The Indus Entrepreneur at Chennai.

He along with his colleagues from the transplant field organised a National Workshop of Transplant Coordinators in 2013 where a consensus document to implement the deceased donation programme in India was submitted to the Director General of Health Services of India.

Publications

Long term renal allograft outcomes using deceased donor kidneys from cobra bite brain dead donors – A Case Series Presentation.

Working towards ethical organ transplants.

Ramachandra Protocol For Organ Donation – "Indian Medical Tribune" Sunil Shroff –  Feb 1997.
Ramachandra Protocol For Organ Donation – "The Antiseptic' – Sunil Shroff – March 1997.

References

External links
Sriramachandra.edu.in
Medindia.net
Mohanfoundation.org
Doctor.ndtv.com

Living people
Medical doctors from Chennai
Indian medical academics
Indian urologists
Kendriya Vidyalaya alumni
Year of birth missing (living people)